The House of Representatives of the Philippines (Kamara or Kamara de Representantes from the Spanish word cámara, meaning "chamber") is the lower house of Congress, the bicameral legislature of the Philippines, with the Senate of the Philippines as the upper house. The lower house is usually called Congress, although the term collectively refers to both houses.

Members of the House are officially styled as representative and sometimes informally called congressmen or congresswomen and are elected to a three-year term. They can be re-elected, but cannot serve more than three consecutive terms except with an interruption of one term like the senate. Around eighty percent of congressmen are district representatives, representing a particular geographical area. The 19th Congress has 253 congressional districts. Party-list representatives are elected through the party-list system which constitutes not more than twenty percent of the total number of representatives.

Aside from needing its agreement to every bill in order to be sent for the president's signature to become law, the House of Representatives has power to impeach certain officials and all franchise and money bills must originate from the lower house.

The House of Representatives is headed by the speaker. The position is currently held by Rep. Martin Romualdez. The speaker of the House is the third in the presidential line of succession, after the vice and senate presidents. The official headquarters of the House of Representatives is at the Batasang Pambansa (literally "national legislature") located in Batasan Hills, Quezon City. The building is often simply called Batasan and the word has also become a metonym to refer to the House of Representatives.

History

Philippine Assembly

At the beginning of American colonial rule, from March 16, 1900, the sole national legislative body was the Philippine Commission with all members appointed by the President of the United States.  Headed by the Governor-General of the Philippines the body exercised all legislative authority given to it by the President and the United States Congress until October 1907 when it was joined by the Philippine Assembly.  William Howard Taft was chosen to be the first American civilian Governor-General and the first leader of this Philippine Commission, which subsequently became known as the Taft Commission.

The Philippine Bill of 1902, a basic law, or organic act, of the Insular Government, mandated that once certain conditions were met a bicameral, or two-chamber, Philippine Legislature would be created with the previously existing, all-appointed Philippine Commission as the upper house and the Philippine Assembly as the lower house.  This bicameral legislature was inaugurated in October 1907.  Under the leadership of Speaker Sergio Osmeña and Floor Leader Manuel L. Quezon, the Rules of the 59th United States Congress was substantially adopted as the Rules of the Philippine Legislature. Osmeña and Quezon led the Nacionalista Party, with a platform of independence from the United States, into successive electoral victories against the Progresista Party and later the Democrata Party, which first advocated United States statehood, then opposed immediate independence.

It is this body, founded as the Philippine Assembly, that would continue in one form or another, and with a few different names, up until the present day.

Jones Act of 1916

In 1916, the Jones Act, officially the Philippine Autonomy Act, changed the legislative system.  The Philippine Commission was abolished and a new fully elected, bicameral Philippine Legislature consisting of a House of Representatives and a Senate was established. The Nacionalistas continued their electoral dominance at this point, although they were split into two factions led by Osmeña and Quezon; the two reconciled in 1924, and controlled the Assembly via a virtual dominant-party system.

Commonwealth and the Third Republic

The legislative system was changed again in 1935.  The 1935 Constitution established a unicameral National Assembly. But in 1940, through an amendment to the 1935 Constitution, a bicameral Congress of the Philippines consisting of a House of Representatives and a Senate was adopted.

Upon the inauguration of the Republic of the Philippines in 1946, Republic Act No. 6 was enacted providing that on the date of the proclamation of the Republic of the Philippines, the existing Congress would be known as the First Congress of the Republic. The "Liberal bloc" of the Nacionalistas permanently split from their ranks, creating the Liberal Party. These two will contest all of the elections in what appeared to be a two-party system. The party of the ruling president wins the elections in the House of Representatives; in cases where the party of the president and the majority of the members of the House of Representatives are different, a sufficient enough number will break away and join the party of the president, thereby ensuring that the president will have control of the House of Representatives.

Martial Law

This set up continued until President Ferdinand Marcos declared martial law and abolished Congress. He would rule by decree even after the 1973 Constitution abolished the bicameral Congress and created a unicameral Batasang Pambansa parliamentary system of government, as parliamentary election would not occur in 1978. Marcos' Kilusang Bagong Lipunan (KBL; New Society Movement) won all of the seats except those from the Central Visayas ushering in an era of KBL dominance, which will continue until the People Power Revolution overthrew Marcos in 1986.

1987 Constitution
The 1987 Constitution restored the presidential system of government together with a bicameral Congress of the Philippines. One deviation from the previous setup was the introduction of the mid-term election; however, the dynamics of the House of Representatives resumed its pre-1972 state, with the party of the president controlling the chamber, although political pluralism ensued that prevented the restoration of the old Nacionalista-Liberal two-party system. Instead, a multi-party system evolved.

Corazon Aquino who nominally had no party, supported the Laban ng Demokratikong Pilipino (LDP; Struggle of the Democratic Filipinos). With the victory of Fidel V. Ramos in the 1992 presidential election, many representatives defected to his Lakas-NUCD party; the same would happen with Joseph Estrada's victory in 1998, but he lost support when he was ousted after the 2001 EDSA Revolution that brought his vice president Gloria Macapagal Arroyo to power. This also meant the restoration of Lakas-NUCD as the top party in the chamber. The same would happen when Benigno Aquino III won in 2010, which returned the Liberals into power.

The presiding officer is the Speaker. Unlike the Senate President, the Speaker usually serves the entire term of Congress, although there had been instances when the Speaker left office due to conflict with the president: examples include Jose de Venecia Jr.'s resignation as speaker in 2008 when his son Joey de Venecia exposed alleged corrupt practices by First Gentleman Mike Arroyo, and Manny Villar's ouster occurred after he allowed the impeachment of President Estrada in 2000.

Electoral system 
The Philippines uses parallel voting for its lower house elections. For the 2022 elections, there will be 316 seats in the House; 253 of these are district representatives, and 63 are party-list representatives. The number of seats to be disputed may change depending on the creation of new congressional districts.

Philippine law mandates that there should be one party-list representative for every four district representatives. District representatives are elected under the plurality voting system from single-member districts. Party-list representatives are elected via the nationwide vote with a 2% election threshold, with a party winning not more than three seats. The party with the most votes usually wins three seats, then the other parties with more than 2% of the vote two seats. At this point, if all of the party-list seats are not filled up, the parties with less than 2% of the vote will win one seat each until all party-list seats are filled up.

Political parties competing in the party-list election are barred from participating district elections, and vice versa, unless permitted by the Commission on Elections. Party-lists and political parties participating in the district elections may forge coalition deals with one another.

Campaigning for elections from congressional districts seats are decidedly local; the candidates are most likely a part of an election slate that includes candidates for other positions in the locality, and slates may comprise different parties. The political parties contesting the election make no attempt to create a national campaign.

Party-list campaigning, on the other hand, is done on a national scale. Parties usually attempt to appeal to a specific demographic. Polling is usually conducted for the party-list election, while pollsters may release polls on specific district races. In district elections, pollsters do not attempt to make forecasts on how many votes a party would achieve, nor the number of seats a party would win; they do attempt to do that in party-list elections, though.

Officers
The members of the House of Representatives who are also its officers are also ex officio members of all of the committees and have a vote.

The leadership positions, except for the Secretary General and Sergeant-at-Arms, are currently vacant. The terms of office of the officers elected during the 18th Congress ended on June 30, 2022. On July 25, 2022, the 19th Congress of the Philippines shall elect among themselves their leaders.

Speaker

The speaker is the head of the House of Representatives. He presides over the session; decides on all questions of order, subject to appeal by any member; signs all acts, resolutions, memorials, writs, warrants, and subpoenas issued by or upon order of the House; appoints, suspends, dismisses, or disciplines House personnel; and exercise administrative functions.

The speaker is elected by a majority of all the members of the House, including vacant seats. The speaker is traditionally elected at the convening of each congress. Before a speaker is elected, the House's sergeant-at-arms sits as the "Presiding Officer" until a speaker is elected. Compared to the Senate President, the unseating of an incumbent speaker is rarer.

Deputy Speakers

There was a position of speaker pro tempore for congresses prior the reorganization of the officers of the House of Representatives during the 10th Congress in 1995. The speaker pro tempore was the next highest position in the House after the speaker.

The position was replaced by deputy speakers in 1995. Originally, there was one Deputy Speaker for each island group of Luzon, Visayas and Mindanao. Then, in 2001 during the 12th Congress, a Deputy Speaker "at large" was created. In the next Congress, another "at large" deputy speakership was created, along with a Deputy Speaker for women. In the 15th Congress starting in 2010, all six deputy speakers are "at large".

In the 16th Congress, the deputy speakers represent the chamber at-large. Starting in the 17th Congress, each region is represented by a Deputy Speaker, with additional deputy speakers from the party-list ranks.

The deputy speakers perform the speaker's role when the speaker is absent. In case in the resignation of the speaker, the deputy speakers shall elect from among themselves an acting speaker, until a speaker is elected.

Majority Floor Leader

The majority leader, aside from being the spokesman of the majority party, is to direct the deliberations on the floor. The Majority Leader is also concurrently the Chairman of the Committee on Rules. The majority leader is elected in a party caucus of the ruling majority party.

Minority Floor Leader

The minority leader is the spokesman of the minority party in the House and is an ex-officio member of all standing Committees. The minority leader is elected in party caucus of all Members of the House in the minority party, although by tradition, the losing candidate for speaker is named the minority leader.

Secretary General
The secretary general enforces orders and decisions of the House; keeps the Journal of each session; notes all questions of order, among other things. The secretary general presides over the chamber at the first legislative session after an election, and is elected by a majority of the members.

As of November 18, 2020, former Batangas Representative Mark L. Mendoza is the Secretary General of the House of Representatives.

Sergeant-at-Arms
The Sergeant-at-Arms is responsible for the maintenance of order in the House of Representatives, among other things. Like the Secretary General, the Sergeant-at-Arms is elected by a majority of the members.

As of October 12, 2020, retired Police Major General Mao Aplasca is the Sergeant-at-Arms of the House of Representatives.

Qualifications
The qualifications for membership in the House are expressly stated in Section 6, Art. VI of the 1987 Philippine Constitution as follows:

No person shall be a Representative unless he/she is a natural-born citizen of the Philippines, and on the day of the election, is at least 25 years of age, able to read and write, a registered voter except for a party-list representative, and a resident of the country for not less than one year immediately preceding the day of the election.
The age is fixed at 25 and must be possessed on the day of the elections, that is, when the polls are opened and the votes cast, and not on the day of the proclamation of the winners by the board of canvassers.
With regard to the residence requirements, it was ruled in the case of Lim v. Pelaez that it must be the place where one habitually resides and to which he, after absence, has the intention of returning.
The enumeration laid down by the 1987 Constitution is exclusive under the Latin principle of expressio unius est exclusio alterius. This means that Congress cannot anymore add additional qualifications other than those provided by the Constitution.

Membership 
There are two types of congressmen: those who represent geographic districts, and those who represent party-lists. The first-past-the-post (simple plurality voting) method is used to determine who represents each of the 243 geographic districts. The party-list representatives are elected via the party-list system. The party-list representatives should always comprise 20% of the seats.

Originally set at 200 in the ordinance of the 1987 constitution, the number of districts has grown to 243. All of the new districts are via created via piecemeal redistricting of the then existing 200 districts, and via the creation of new provinces and cities. The constitution gave Congress to nationally redistrict the country after the release of every census, but this has not been done.

The original 200 districts meant that there should have been 50 party-list representatives. However, the constitution did not give the specifics on how party-list congressmen should have been elected. This led to presidents appointing sectoral representatives, which were then approved by the Commission on Appointments; only a handful of sectoral representatives were seated in this way. With the enactment of the Party-List System Act, the first party-list election was in 1998; with the 2% election threshold, a 3-seat cap and tens of parties participating, this led to only about a fraction of the party-list seats being distributed. Eventually, there had been several Supreme Court decisions changing the way the winning seats are distributed, ensuring that all party-list seats are filled up.

There were supposed to be 245 congressional districts that were to be disputed in the 2019 election, so there were 61 party-list seats contested in the party-list election. Elections in two of these districts were delayed due to its creation right before campaigning. The Supreme Court ruled that one district be contested in the next (2022) election, then the Commission on Elections applied the court's ruling to the other district, bringing the number of districts to 243, while still keeping the 61 party-list representatives, for a total of 304 seats.

Vacancies from representatives elected via districts are dealt with special elections, which may be done if the vacancy occurred less than a year before the next regularly-scheduled election. Special elections are infrequently done; despite several vacancies, the last special election was in 2012. For party-list representatives, the nominee next on the list is asked to replace the outgoing representative; if the nominee agrees, then that person would be sworn in as a member, if the nominee doesn't agree, then the nominee after that person is asked, and the process is repeated. Vacating party-list representatives have always been replaced this way.

Congressional district representation 

Eighty percent of representatives shall come from congressional districts, with each district returning one representative. The constitution mandates that every province and every city with a population of 250,000 must have at least one representative. Each legislative district, regardless of population, has one congressman. For provinces that have more than one legislative district, the provincial districts are identical to the corresponding legislative district, with the exclusion of cities that do not vote for provincial officials. If cities are divided into multiple districts for city hall representation purposes, these are also used for congressional representation.

The representatives from the districts comprise at most 80% of the members of the House; therefore, for a party to have a majority of seats in the House, the party needs to win a larger majority of district seats. No party since the approval of the 1987 constitution has been able to win a majority of seats, hence coalitions are not uncommon.

Legislative districts in provinces 

 Abra (1)
 Agusan del Norte (2)
 Agusan del Sur (2)
 Aklan (2)
 Albay (3)
 Antique (1)
 Apayao (1)
 Aurora (1)
 Basilan (1)
 Bataan (3)
 Batanes (1)
 Batangas (6) 
 Benguet (1)
 Biliran (1)
 Bohol (3)
 Bukidnon (4)
 Bulacan (6)
 Cagayan (3)
 Camarines Norte (2)
 Camarines Sur (5)
 Camiguin (1)
 Capiz (2)
 Catanduanes (1)
 Cavite (8)
 Cebu (7)
 Cotabato (3)
 Davao de Oro (2)
 Davao del Norte (2)
 Davao Occidental (1)
 Davao Oriental (2)
 Davao del Sur (1)
 Dinagat Islands (1)
 Eastern Samar (1)
 Guimaras (1)
 Ifugao (1)
 Ilocos Norte (2)
 Ilocos Sur (2)
 Iloilo (5)
 Isabela (6)
 Kalinga (1)
 La Union (2)
 Laguna (4)
 Lanao del Norte (2)
 Lanao del Sur (2)
 Leyte (5)
 Maguindanao (2)
 Marinduque (1)
 Masbate (3)
 Misamis Occidental (2)
 Misamis Oriental (2)
 Mountain Province (1)
 Negros Occidental (6)
 Negros Oriental (3)
 Northern Samar (2)
 Nueva Ecija (4)
 Nueva Vizcaya (1)
 Occidental Mindoro (1)
 Oriental Mindoro (2)
 Palawan (3)
 Pampanga (4)
 Pangasinan (6) 
 Quezon (4)
 Quirino (1)
 Rizal (4)
 Romblon (1)
 Samar (2)
 Sarangani (1)
 Siquijor (1)
 Sorsogon (2)
 South Cotabato (2)
 Southern Leyte (2)
 Sultan Kudarat (2)
 Sulu (2)
 Surigao del Norte (2)
 Surigao del Sur (2)
 Tarlac (3)
 Tawi-Tawi (1)
 Zambales (2)
 Zamboanga del Norte (3)
 Zamboanga del Sur (2)
 Zamboanga Sibugay (2)

Legislative districts in cities 

Antipolo (2)
Bacolod (1)
Baguio (1)
Biñan (1)
Butuan (1)
Cagayan de Oro (2)
Calamba (1)
Caloocan (3)
Cebu City (2)
Davao City (3)
Iligan (1)
General Santos (1)
Iloilo City (1)
Lapu-Lapu (1)
Las Piñas (1)
Makati (2)
Malabon (1)
Mandaluyong (1)
Mandaue (1)
Manila (6)
Marikina (2)
Muntinlupa (1)
Navotas (1)
Parañaque (2)
Pasay (1)
Pasig (1)
Pateros and Taguig (1)
Quezon City (6)
San Jose del Monte (1)
San Juan (1)
Santa Rosa (1)
Taguig (1)
Valenzuela (2)
Zamboanga City (2)

Party-list representation 

The party-list system is the name designated for party-list representation. Under the 1987 Constitution, the electorate can vote for certain party-list organizations in order to give voice to significant minorities of society that would otherwise not be adequately represented through geographical district. From 1987 to 1998, party-list representatives were appointed by the President.

Since 1998, each voter votes for a single party-list organization. Organizations that garner at least 2% of the total number of votes are awarded one representative for every 2% up to a maximum of three representatives. Thus, there can be at most 50 party-list representatives in Congress, though usually no more than 20 are elected because many organizations do not reach the required 2% minimum number of votes.

After the 2007 election, in a controversial decision, the Supreme Court ordered the COMELEC to change how it allocates the party-list seats. Under the new formula only one party will have the maximum 3 seats. It based its decision on a formula contained in the VFP vs. COMELEC decision. In 2009, in the BANAT vs. COMELEC decision, it was changed anew in which parties with less than 2% of the vote were given seats to fulfill the 20% quota as set forth in the constitution.

Aside from determining which party won and allocating the number of seats won per party, another point of contention was whether the nominees should be a member of the marginalized group they are supposed to represent; in the Ang Bagong Bayani vs. COMELEC decision, the Supreme Court not only ruled that the nominees should be a member of the marginalized sector, but it also disallowed major political parties from participating in the party-list election. However, on the BANAT decision, the court ruled that since the law didn't specify who belongs to a marginalized sector, the court allowed anyone to be a nominee as long as the nominee as a member of the party (not necessarily the marginalized group the party is supposed to represent).

Sectoral representation 
Prior to the enactment of the Party-list Act, the president, with the advice and consent of the Commission on Appointments, nominated sectoral representatives. These represented various sectors, from labor, peasants, urban poor, the youth, women and cultural communities. Their numbers grew from 15 members in the 8th Congress, to 32 in the 10th Congress.

In the Interim Batasang Pambansa, a sectoral election was held to fill up the sectoral seats of parliament.

Legislative caretakers
Under the Republic Act No. 6645 or "An Act Prescribing the Manner of Filling a Vacancy in the Congress of the Philippines", if a seat was vacated with at most 18 months prior to an election the House of Representatives could request the Commission on Elections to hold a special election to fill in the vacancy. The law does not specify for a mechanism if the seat was vacated within 18 months prior to an election. The House of Representatives through its Speaker customarily appoints a caretaker or legislative liaison officer to fill in the vacancy. The caretaker cannot vote in the name of the district that is being taken care of.

Redistricting

Congress is mandated to reapportion the legislative districts within three years following the return of every census. Since its restoration in 1987, Congress has not passed any general apportionment law, despite the publication of six censuses in 1990, 1995, 2000, 2007, 2010 and 2015. The increase in the number of representative districts since 1987 were mostly due to the creation of new provinces, cities, and piecemeal redistricting of certain provinces and cities.

The apportionment of congressional districts is not dependent upon a specially-mandated independent government body, but rather through Republic Acts which are drafted by members of Congress. Therefore, apportionment often can be influenced by political motivations. Incumbent representatives who are not permitted by law to serve after three consecutive terms sometimes resort to dividing their district, or even creating a new province which will be guaranteed a seat, just so that their allies be able to run, while "switching offices" with them. Likewise, politicians whose political fortunes are likely to be jeopardized by any change in district boundaries may delay or even ignore the need for reapportionment.

Since 1987, the creation of some new congressional districts have been met with controversy, especially due to incumbent political clans and their allies benefiting from the new district arrangements. Some of these new congressional districts are tied to the creation of a new province, because such an act necessarily entails the creation of a new congressional district.
 Creation of Davao Occidental, 2013: The rival Cagas and Bautista clans dominate politics in the province of Davao del Sur; their members have been elected as congressional representatives for the first and second districts of the province since 1987. However, the province's governorship has been in contest between the two clans in recent years: Claude Bautista, the current governor, was elected in 2013; before that Douglas Cagas served as governor from 2007 to 2013, after succeeding Benjamin Bautista Jr. who served from 2002 to 2007. Supporters of both clans have been subjected to political violence, prompting the police to put the province of Davao del Sur in the election watchlist. The law which created Davao Occidental, Republic Act No. 10360, was co-authored by House Representatives Marc Douglas Cagas IV and Franklin Bautista as House Bill 4451; the creation of the new province is seen as a way to halt the "often violent" political rivalry between the clans by ensuring that the Cagas and Bautista clans have separate domains. 
 Reapportionment of Camarines Sur, 2009: A new congressional district was created within Camarines Sur under Republic Act No. 9716, which resulted in the reduction of the population of the province's first district to below the Constitutional ideal of 250,000 inhabitants. The move was seen as a form of political accommodation that would (and ultimately did) prevent two allies of then-President Gloria Macapagal Arroyo from running in the same district. Rolando Andaya, who was on his third term as congressman for the first district, was appointed Budget Secretary in 2006; his plans to run as representative of the same district in 2010 put him in direct competition with Diosdado Macapagal-Arroyo, the president's youngest son, who was also seeking re-election. Then-Senator Noynoy Aquino challenged the constitutionality of the law but the Supreme Court of the Philippines ultimately ruled that the creation of the new district was constitutional.
 Creation of Dinagat Islands, 2007: The separation of Dinagat Islands from Surigao del Norte has further solidified the hold of the Ecleo clan over the impoverished and typhoon-prone area, which remains among the poorest provinces in the country.

Most populous legislative districts
Currently the district with the lowest population is the lone district of Batanes, with only 18,831 inhabitants in 2020. The most populous congressional district, the 1st District of Rizal, has around 69 times more inhabitants. Data below reflect the district boundaries for the 2019 elections, and the population counts from the 2020 census.

Underrepresentation
Because of the lack of a nationwide reapportionment after the publication of every census since the Constitution was promulgated in 1987, faster-growing provinces and cities have become severely underrepresented. Each legislative district is ideally supposed to encompass a population of 250,000.

Powers
The House of Representatives is modeled after the United States House of Representatives; the two chambers of Congress have roughly equal powers, and every bill or resolution that has to go through both houses needs the consent of both chambers before being passed for the president's signature. Once a bill is defeated in the House of Representatives, it is lost. Once a bill is approved by the House of Representatives on third reading, the bill is passed to the Senate, unless an identical bill has also been passed by the lower house. When a counterpart bill in the Senate is different from the one passed by the House of Representatives, either a bicameral conference committee is created consisting of members from both chambers of Congress to reconcile the differences, or either chamber may instead approve the other chamber's version.

Just like most lower houses, franchise and money bills originate in the House of Representatives, but the Senate may still propose or concur with amendments, same with bills of local application and private bills. The House of Representatives has the sole power to initiate impeachment proceedings, and may impeach an official by a vote of one-third of its members. Once an official is impeached, the Senate tries that official.

Seat

The Batasang Pambansa Complex (National Legislature) at Quezon City is the seat of the House of Representatives since its restoration in 1987; it took its name from the Batasang Pambansa, the national parliament which convened there from 1978 to 1986.

The Philippine Legislature was inaugurated at the Manila Grand Opera House at 1907, then it conducted business at the Ayuntamiento in Intramuros. Governor-General Leonard Wood summoned the 2nd Philippine Legislature at Baguio and convened at The Mansion in Baguio for three weeks. The legislature returned to the Ayutamiento, as the Legislative Building was being constructed; it first convened there on July 26, 1926. The House of Representatives continued to occupy the second floor until 1945 when the area was shelled during the Battle of Manila. The building was damaged beyond repair and Congress convened at the Old Japanese Schoolhouse at Lepanto (modern-day S. H. Loyola) Street, Manila until the Legislative Building can be occupied again in 1949. Congress stayed at the Legislative Building, by now called the Congress Building, until President Marcos shut Congress and ruled by decree starting in 1972.

Marcos then oversaw the construction of the new home of parliament at Quezon City, which convened in 1978. The parliament, called the Batasang Pambansa continued to sit there until the passage of the 1986 Freedom Constitution. The House of Representatives inherited the Batasang Pambansa Complex in 1987.

Batasang Pambansa Complex
The Batasang Pambansa Complex, now officially called the House of Representatives Building Complex, is at the National Government Center, Constitution Hills, Quezon City. Accessible via Commonwealth Avenue, the complex consists of four buildings. The Main Building hosts the session hall; the North and South wings, inaugurated in December 1977, are attached to it. The newest building, the Ramon Mitra, Jr. Building, was completed in 2001. It houses the Legislative Library, the Committee offices, the Reference and Research Bureau, and the Conference Rooms.

Current composition 

The members of the House of Representatives, aside from being grouped into political parties, are also grouped into the "majority bloc", "minority bloc" and "independents" (different from the independent in the sense that they are not affiliated into a political party). Originally, members who voted for the winning Speaker belong to the majority and members who voted for the opponent are the minority. The majority and minority bloc are to elect amongst themselves a floor leader. While members are allowed to switch blocs, they must do so in writing. Also, the bloc where they intend to transfer shall accept their application through writing. When the bloc the member ought to transfer refuses to accept the transferring member, or a member does not want to be a member of either bloc, that member becomes an independent member. A member that transfers to a new bloc forfeits one's committee chairmanships and memberships, until the bloc the member transfers to elects the member to committees.

The membership in each committee should be in proportion to the size of each bloc, with each bloc deciding who amongst them who will go to each committee, upon a motion by the floor leader concerned to the House of Representatives in plenary. The Speaker, Deputy Speakers, floor leaders, deputy floor leaders and the chairperson of the Committee on Accounts can vote in committees; the committee chairperson can only vote to break a tie.

To ensure that the representatives each get their pork barrel, most of them will join the majority bloc, or even to the president's party, as basis of patronage politics (known as the Padrino System locally); thus, the House of Representatives always aligns itself with the party of the sitting president.

The majority bloc sits at the right side of the speaker, facing the House of Representatives.

Leadership 
House Speaker: Cong. Martin Romualdez
Deputy Speakers:
Congw. Gloria Macapagal Arroyo
Cong. Isidro Ungab
Cong. Roberto V. Puno
Congw. Kristine Singson-Meehan
Congw. Camille Villar
Cong. Raymond Democrito C. Mendoza
Cong. Ralph Recto
Cong. Aurelio "Dong" D. Gonzales Jr.
Cong. Vincent Franco "Duke" D. Frasco
Majority Floor Leader: Cong. Manuel Jose "Mannix" M. Dalipe
Minority Floor Leader: Cong. Marcelino C. Libanan
Secretary-General: Reginald S. Velasco

19th Congress Standing Committees

Latest election

Elections at congressional districts

Party-list election

See also
 List of Philippine House committees
 2007 Batasang Pambansa bombing
 Politics of the Philippines
 President of the Philippines
 Executive Departments of the Philippines
 Congress of the Philippines
 Senate of the Philippines
 Ombudsman of the Philippines
 Supreme Court of the Philippines
 Republic Acts of the Philippines
 Batasang Pambansa

Notes

References

External links
Official Website of the 18th Congress
Official Website of the House of Representatives
Official Website of the Senate

 
1907 establishments in the Philippines
Philippines